Kenneth Moore may refer to:

Sports

Gridiron football
Kenneth Moore (American football) (born 1985), American football wide receiver
Kenny Moore (American football) (born 1995), American football cornerback
Ken Moore (Canadian football) (1925–2016), Canadian football player

Other sports
Kenneth Moore (ice hockey) (1910–1982), Canadian ice hockey player
Kenny Moore (1943–2022), American distance runner and journalist
Ken Moore (cricketer) (1940–1998), English cricketer

Others
Kenneth Moore or Big Moe (1974–2007), American rapper

See also
Kenneth More (1914–1982), English actor
Ken More (1907–1993), Canadian politician